Mahbubul A Khalid (born 1967) is a Bangladeshi poet, lyricist and music composer.

Songs
Many musicians composed the music of his songs including Ahmed Imtiaz Bulbul, Ibrar Tipu, Emon Saha, Kishor Das, Atikur Rahman Roman. 

Many singers rendered their voices to his songs among them Subir Nandi, Dinat Jahan Munni, Samina Chowdhury, Imran Mahmudul, Dilshad Nahar Kona, Salma Akhter, Rajib Hossain, and Konal. 

Mahbubul A Khalid has written ~300 songs that have been published or recorded.

References

Living people
1967 births
Bangladeshi composers
Bangladeshi lyricists
People from Tangail District